Elcysma ziroensis, the Apatani glory, is a moth of the family Zygaenidae. The species was first described by Punyo Chada, Monsoon Jyoti Gogoi and James John Young in 2017. It is endemic to the Arunachal Pradesh, India.

References 

Moths of Asia
Chalcosiinae
Insects described in 2017